The Turks in Israel, also referred to as Israeli Turkmen are ethnic Turkish descendants who have had a long-established presence in the region. 

Migration of Turkish settlers to the Levant began in the 12th century, and continued throughout the Mamluk and Ottoman rule.

In the early 2000s, Turkish workers from the Republic of Turkey settled in Israel, working predominantly on construction projects.

Diaspora
During and after the 1947–1949 Palestine war, some Turkmen fled the region and settled in Jordan, Syria, and Lebanon.

During the British mandate of Palestine, the Turk tribes like Bani-Saidan and Bani Alaqama lived mostly in the Jezreel Valley region; and, up until the Israeli conquest in 1967, Turkmen tribes lived in the Golan Heights.

See also
Arkadaş Association
Circassians in Israel
Israel–Turkey relations
Turkish Jews in Israel
Turkish minorities in the former Ottoman Empire

References

Bibliography

.
.
.

 
Ethnic groups in Israel
 
 
 
Israel–Turkey relations
Turkish diaspora
Ethnic groups in the Middle East